Danilo Kuzmanović (born January 4, 1992) is a Serbian footballer who is currently a free agent.

Born in Belgrade, he previously played for Swedish side Djurgårdens IF and during the winter break of the 2011-12 season he rejoined Serbian SuperLiga side FK Rad.

References

External links
Profile at Dif.se

1992 births
Living people
Footballers from Belgrade
Serbian footballers
Serbia youth international footballers
Allsvenskan players
Superettan players
FK Rad players
Djurgårdens IF Fotboll players
Expatriate footballers in Sweden
FK Jedinstvo Užice players
FK Donji Srem players
FK Zemun players
IK Frej players
Serbian expatriate footballers

Association football fullbacks